An arch is a vertical curved structure that spans an elevated space and may or may not support the weight above it, or in case of a horizontal arch like an arch dam, the hydrostatic pressure against it.

Arches may be synonymous with vaults, but a vault may be distinguished as a continuous arch forming a roof. Arches appeared as early as the 2nd millennium BC in Mesopotamian brick architecture, and their systematic use started with the ancient Romans, who were the first to apply the technique to a wide range of structures.

Basic concepts

An arch is a pure compression form. It can span a large area by resolving forces into compressive stresses, and thereby eliminating tensile stresses. This is sometimes denominated "arch action". As the forces in the arch are transferred to its base, the arch pushes outward at its base, denominated "thrust". As the rise, i. e. height, of the arch decreases the outward thrust increases. In order to preserve arch action and prevent collapse of the arch, the thrust must be restrained, either by internal ties or external bracing, such as abutments.

Fixed versus hinged arches

The most common kinds of true arch are the fixed arch, the two-hinged arch, and the three-hinged arch.

The fixed arch is most often used in reinforced concrete bridges and tunnels, which have short spans. Because it is subject to additional internal stress from thermal expansion and contraction, this kind of arch is considered statically indeterminate.

The two-hinged arch is most often used to bridge long spans. This kind of arch has pinned connections at its base. Unlike that of the fixed arch, the pinned base can rotate, thus allowing the structure to move freely and compensate for the thermal expansion and contraction that changes in outdoor temperature cause. However, this can result in additional stresses, and therefore the two-hinged arch is also statically indeterminate, although not as much as the fixed arch.

The three-hinged arch is not only hinged at its base, like the two-hinged arch, yet also at its apex. The additional apical connection allows the three-hinged arch to move in two opposite directions and compensate for any expansion and contraction. This kind of arch is thus not subject to additional stress from thermal change. Unlike the other two kinds of arch, the three-hinged arch is therefore statically determinate. It is most often used for spans of medial length, such as those of roofs of large buildings. Another advantage of the three-hinged arch is that the pinned bases are more easily developed than fixed ones, which allows shallow, bearing-type foundations in spans of medial length. In the three-hinged arch "thermal expansion and contraction of the arch will cause vertical movements at the peak pin joint but will have no appreciable effect on the bases," which further simplifies foundational design.

Forms

The many forms of arch are classified into three categories: circular, pointed, and parabolic. Arches can also be configured to produce vaults and arcades.

Rounded, i. e. semicircular, arches were commonly used for ancient arches that were constructed of heavy masonry. Ancient Roman builders relied heavily on the rounded arch to span great lengths. Several rounded arches that are constructed in-line and end-to-end in a series form an arcade, e.g. in Roman aqueducts.

Pointed arches were most often used in Gothic architecture. The advantage of a pointed arch, rather than a circular one, is that the arch action produces less horizontal thrust at the base. This innovation allowed for taller and more closely spaced openings, which are typical of Gothic architecture.

Vaults are essentially "adjacent arches [that] are assembled side by side." If vaults intersect, their intersections produce complex forms. The forms, along with the "strongly expressed ribs at the vault intersections, were dominant architectural features of Gothic cathedrals."

The parabolic arch employs the principle that when weight is uniformly applied to an arch, the internal compression resulting from that weight will follow a parabolic profile. Of all forms of arch, the parabolic arch produces the most thrust at the base yet can span the greatest distances. It is commonly used in bridges, where long spans are needed.

The catenary arch has a different shape from the parabolic arch. Being the shape of the curve that a loose span of chain or rope traces, the catenary is the structurally ideal shape for a freestanding arch of constant thickness.

Forms of arch displayed chronologically, roughly in chronological order of development:

History

Bronze Age: ancient Near East
True arches, as opposed to corbel arches, were known by a number of civilizations in the ancient Near East including the Levant, but their use was infrequent and mostly confined to underground structures, such as drains where the problem of lateral thrust is greatly diminished.
An example of the latter would be the Nippur arch, built before 3800 BC, and dated by  H. V. Hilprecht (1859–1925) to even before 4000 BC. Rare exceptions are an arched mudbrick home doorway dated to circa 2000 BC from Tell Taya in Iraq and two Bronze Age arched Canaanite city gates, one at Ashkelon (dated to c. 1850 BC), and one at Tel Dan (dated to c. 1750 BC), both in modern-day Israel. An Elamite tomb dated 1500 BC from Haft Teppe contains a parabolic vault which is considered one of the earliest evidences of arches in Iran.

Classical Persia and Greece
In ancient Persia, the Achaemenid Empire (550 BC–330 BC) built small barrel vaults (essentially a series of arches built together to form a hall) known as iwan, which became massive, monumental structures during the later Parthian Empire (247 BC–AD 224). This architectural tradition was continued by the Sasanian Empire (224–651), which built the Taq Kasra at Ctesiphon in the 6th century AD, the largest free-standing vault until modern times.

An early European example of a voussoir arch appears in the 4th century BC Greek Rhodes Footbridge.

Ancient Rome
The ancient Romans learned the arch from the Etruscans, refined it and were the first builders in Europe to tap its full potential for above ground buildings:

The Romans were the first builders in Europe, perhaps the first in the world, to fully appreciate the advantages of the arch, the vault and the dome.

Throughout the Roman empire, their engineers erected arch structures such as bridges, aqueducts, and gates. They also introduced the triumphal arch as a military monument. Vaults began to be used for roofing large interior spaces such as halls and temples, a function that was also assumed by domed structures from the 1st century BC onwards.

The segmental arch was first built by the Romans who realized that an arch in a bridge did not have to be a semicircle, such as in Alconétar Bridge or Ponte San Lorenzo. They were also routinely used in house construction, as in Ostia Antica (see picture).

Ancient China
In ancient China, most architecture was wooden, including the few known arch bridges from literature and one artistic depiction in stone-carved relief. Therefore, the only surviving examples of architecture from the Han Dynasty (202 BC – 220 AD) are rammed earth defensive walls and towers, ceramic roof tiles from no longer existent wooden buildings, stone gate towers, and underground brick tombs that, although featuring vaults, domes, and archways, were built with the support of the earth and were not free-standing.

Roman and Chinese bridges in comparison
China's oldest surviving stone arch bridge is the Anji Bridge, built between 595 CE and 605 CE during the Sui Dynasty; it is the oldest open-spandrel segmental arch bridge in stone.

However, the ancient Romans had virtually all of these components beforehand; for example, Trajan's Bridge that was built between 103 AD and 105 AD,  had open spandrels built in wood on stone pillars.

Gothic Europe
The first example of an early Gothic arch in Europe is in Sicily in the Greek fortifications of Gela. The semicircular arch was followed in Europe by the pointed Gothic arch or ogive, whose centreline more closely follows the forces of compression and which is therefore stronger. The semicircular arch can be flattened to make an elliptical arch, as in the Ponte Santa Trinita. Parabolic arches were introduced in construction by the Spanish architect Antoni Gaudí, who admired the structural system of the Gothic style, but for the buttresses, which he termed "architectural crutches". The first examples of the pointed arch in the European architecture are in Sicily and date back to the Arab-Norman period.

Horseshoe arch: Aksum and Syria
The horseshoe arch is based on the semicircular arch, but its lower ends are extended further round the circle until they start to converge. The first known built horseshoe arches are from the Kingdom of Aksum in modern-day Ethiopia and Eritrea, dating from ca. 3rd–4th century. This is around the same time as the earliest contemporary examples in Roman Syria, suggesting either an Aksumite or Syrian origin for the type.

India
Vaulted roof of an early Harappan burial chamber has been noted from Rakhigarhi. S.R Rao reports vaulted roof of a small chamber in a house from Lothal. Barrel vaults were also used in the Late Harappan Cemetery H culture dated 1900 BC-1300 BC which formed the roof of the metal working furnace, the discovery was made by Vats in 1940 during excavation at Harappa.

In India, Bhitargaon temple (450 AD) and Mahabodhi temple (7th century AD) built in by Gupta Dynasty are the earliest surviving examples of the use of voussoir arch vault system in India. The earlier uses semicircular arch, while the later contains examples of both gothic style pointed arch and semicircular arches. Although introduced in the 5th century, arches didn't gain prominence in the Indian architecture until 12th century after Islamic conquest. The Gupta era arch vault system was later used extensively in Burmese Buddhist temples in Pyu and Bagan in 11th and 12th centuries.

Corbel arch: pre-Columbian Mexico
This article does not deal with a different architectural element, the corbel arch. However, it is worthwhile mentioning that corbel arches were found in other parts of ancient Asia, Africa, Europe, and the Americas. In 2010, a robot discovered a long arch-roofed passageway underneath the Pyramid of Quetzalcoatl, which stands in the ancient city of Teotihuacan north of Mexico City, dated to around 200 AD.

Construction

Since it is a pure compression form, the arch is useful because many building materials, including stone and unreinforced concrete, can resist compression, but are weak when tensile stress is applied to them (ref: similar to the AL-Karparo [8:04]).

An arch is held in place by the weight of all of its members, making construction problematic. One answer is to build a frame (historically, of wood) which exactly follows the form of the underside of the arch. This is known as a centre or centring. Voussoirs are laid on it until the arch is complete and self-supporting. For an arch higher than head height, scaffolding would be required, so it could be combined with the arch support. Arches may fall when the frame is removed if design or construction has been faulty. The first attempt at the A85 bridge at Dalmally, Scotland suffered this fate, in the 1940s. The interior and lower line or curve of an arch is known as the intrados.

Old arches sometimes need reinforcement due to decay of the keystones, forming what is known as bald arch.

In reinforced concrete construction, the principle of the arch is used so as to benefit from the concrete's strength in resisting compressive stress. Where any other form of stress is raised, such as tensile or torsional stress, it has to be resisted by carefully placed reinforcement rods or fibres.

Other types
A depressed arch is one that appears "squashed" down at the top from the full arched shape.  In pointed-arch styles, where there is a central point at the top of the arch, it may be a four-centred arch or Tudor arch.

A blind arch is an arch infilled with solid construction so it cannot function as a window, door, or passageway.  These are common as decorative treatments of a wall surface in many architectural styles, especially Romanesque architecture.

A special form of the arch is the triumphal arch, usually built to celebrate a victory in war. A famous example is the Arc de Triomphe in Paris, France.

Rock formations may form natural arches through erosion, rather than being carved or constructed. Structures such as this can be found in Arches National Park. Some rock balance sculptures are in the form of an arch.

The arches of the foot support the weight of the human body.

Gallery

See also

 Arch bridge
 Arch dam
 Catenary arch
 Dome
 Golden Arches
 List of longest natural arches
 List of post-Roman triumphal arches
 List of Roman triumphal arches
 Natural arch
 Order moulding
 Skew arch
 Suspension bridge

References

Further reading

External links

 Physics of Stone Arches by Nova: a model to build an arch without it collapsing
 InteractiveTHRUST: interactive applets, tutorials
 Paper about the three-hinged arch of the Galerie des Machines of 1889 Whitten by Javier Estévez Cimadevila & Isaac López César.

 
 
Natural arches
Bridge components